Salt Run may refer to:

Salt Run (Noble County, Ohio)
Salt Run (Warren County, Ohio)